Chen Chi-hsin (born May 16, 1962) is a Taiwanese baseball player who competed in the 1992 Summer Olympics.

He was part of the Chinese Taipei baseball team which won the silver medal. He played as catcher.

External links
profile

1962 births
Living people
Baseball players at the 1992 Summer Olympics
Olympic baseball players of Taiwan
Taiwanese baseball players
Olympic silver medalists for Taiwan
Olympic medalists in baseball

Medalists at the 1992 Summer Olympics
People from Hualien County